The 1969–70 Copa del Generalísimo was the 68th staging of the Spanish Cup. The competition began on 8 October 1969 and concluded on 28 June 1970 with the final.

Round of 16

|}

Quarter-finals

|}

Semi-finals

|}

Final

|}

External links
 rsssf.com
 linguasport.com

Copa del Rey seasons
Copa del Rey
Copa